The Haves and the Have Nots is an American primetime television soap opera created, executive produced, written and directed by Tyler Perry. The premise of the series is loosely based on Perry's 2011 play The Haves and the Have Nots.

The series follows three families and their lifestyles as they intersect with one another in Savannah, Georgia: the rich and powerful Cryer and Harrington families (dubbed "The Haves") and the poor and destitute Young family (dubbed "The Have Nots").

Series overview

Episodes

Season 1 (2013–14)

Season 2 (2015)

Season 3 (2016)

Season 4 (2017)

Season 5 (2018–19)

Season 6 (2019)

Season 7 (2020)

Season 8 (2020–21)

Ratings

References

Lists of American drama television series episodes